Six Pounds of Sound is the only studio album by American metal comedy rock band Taintstick. It was released on October 27, 2009 through Suburban Noize Records.

Track listing
Six Pounds of Sound contains 13 tracks

 "Balls"
 "Six Pounds of Sound"
 "Apple Juice"
 "Motodick"
 "Handjob"
 "Monkeys of War"
 "Load"
 "Fuck Your Face"
 "A6k"
 "Sir Eagle Cock III"
 "Dr. Banger’s Mix"
 "I Love Tiger, I Love Fifty"
 "F*k Ur Face (Clean Version)"

Reception and Chart Performance
Six Pounds of Sound peaked at #10 on the American iTunes Top Albums Chart, and #11 on the Canadian iTunes Albums Chart.

Personnel

Taintstick
Jason "Tit Cobra" Ellis – vocals
Josh "Tussinwolf" Richmond – bass, cowbell, keys
Michael "Shaft Burn" Tully – lead guitar
Christian "Shoebox" Hand - drums

Guest Musicians
Matthew DiPanni (Guitars on 'Handjob')
Michael Vincze (Guitars on 'Handjob')

2009 albums